Schwandorf station is the second most important regional transport hub in the Upper Palatinate province of Bavaria after Regensburg Hauptbahnhof, and one of the two working railway stations in the town of Schwandorf. It is classified as a category 3 station by Deutsche Bahn.

History 
The station was opened on 12 December 1859 by the Bavarian Eastern Railway Company, when the Nuremberg–Schwandorf–Regensburg route was taken into service. Just under four years later, on 1 October 1863, the Schwandorf–Weiden line was opened and, in 1865, it was extended to Eger. The link to Cham was opened on  7 January 1861 and in autumn of that year the line was opened all the way through to Prague via Furth im Wald and Pilsen. The result was that two lines passed through the town, one in a north-south and one in an east-west direction. These lines still exist, although Schwandorf can no longer be called a "railwayman's town" as used to be the case.

Infrastructure and facilities 
The station has eleven main lines of which five are used for passenger services. The home platform and the two island platforms are 38 cm high and do not meet the requirement for barrier-free admission. In the station building, there is a ticket machine, a newsagent, a bakery, and a shop for travellers with a bistro.

Transport links 
About a hundred trains runs daily from Schwandorf station. Direct connexions include those to:
 Furth im Wald (hourly, ALX+RE+RB)
 Weiden-Hof (hourly, ALX+RE+VBG)
 Nürnberg (hourly, RE)
 Regensburg (hourly, ALX+RE+VBG)
 Munich (every 2 hours, ALX)
 Prague (4 per day, ALX+RE)
 Gera (3 per day, RE)

Next to the railway station is a bus station, from which buses depart to all parts of the town and the local area.
A Park-and-Ride car park and taxi stand are also available at the station.

Klardorf station 
South of Schwandorf in the suburb of Klardorf there is another station at which no passenger trains have stopped since 2 June 1985.

References

External links

Information about Schwandorf station at bahnhof.de
Information about Irrenlohe station at bahnhof.de

Railway stations in Bavaria
Railway stations in Germany opened in 1859
Buildings and structures in Schwandorf (district)